A Mk 44 may refer to:

 Mark 44 torpedo
 Mk44 Bushmaster II, a chain gun
 The GAU-17/A minigun